Virginia City is a city located in Storey County, Nevada.

Virginia City may also refer to:
 Virginia City, Montana
 Virginia City, Texas
 Virginia City (film), a 1940 film starring Errol Flynn